The United States District Court for the Western District of Wisconsin (in case citations, W.D. Wis.) is a federal court in the Seventh Circuit (except for patent claims and claims against the U.S. government under the Tucker Act, which are appealed to the Federal Circuit).

The district was established on June 30, 1870.

 the Acting United States Attorney is Timothy M. O’Shea.

Organization of the court

The United States District Court for the Western District of Wisconsin is one of two federal judicial districts in Wisconsin. Court for the Western District is held at Madison.

The district comprises the following counties: Adams, Ashland, Barron, Bayfield, Buffalo, Burnett, Chippewa, Clark, Columbia, Crawford, Dane, Douglas, Dunn, Eau Claire, Grant, Green, Iowa, Iron, Jackson, Jefferson, Juneau, La Crosse, Lafayette, Lincoln, Marathon, Monroe, Oneida, Pepin, Pierce, Polk, Portage, Price, Richland, Rock, Rusk, Sauk, St. Croix, Sawyer, Taylor, Trempealeau, Vernon, Vilas, Washburn and Wood.

Current judges
:

Former judges

Chief judges

Succession of seats

See also
 Courts of Wisconsin
 List of current United States district judges
 List of United States federal courthouses in Wisconsin

References

External links

 United States District Court, Western District of Wisconsin

Wisconsin, Western District
Wisconsin law
Organizations based in Madison, Wisconsin
Courts and tribunals established in 1870
1870 establishments in Wisconsin
Courthouses in Wisconsin
Madison, Wisconsin